Webster University Orlando is a university campus located in downtown Orlando, Florida. This campus location is an extended campus of  Webster University main campus in St. Louis, Missouri.

Previously, Webster University operated two extended campus locations in the Orlando metro area; one in Longwood and one near Williamsburg. In June 2016, those two campus location resources were combined into one more robust campus in downtown Orlando near the Amway Center. Currently, they have campuses positioned strategically across the U.S., including Florida.

Academic programs
 Master of Business Administration
 Master of Health Administration	
 MS in Finance	
 MA in Counseling
 MS in Cybersecurity
 MA in Human Resources Management
 MA in Human Services
 MA in Information Technology Management	
 MA in Management and Leadership
 Certificate in Project Management	
 Certificate in Global Business	
 Certificate in Government Contracting	
 Certificate in Cybersecurity Threat Detection

References

External links

Webster University
Universities and colleges in Orlando, Florida
1991 establishments in Florida
Educational institutions established in 1991
Private universities and colleges in Florida